Nippu Ravva is a 1993 Telugu-language action film, produced by M. V. Srinivas Prasad for Yuvarathna Arts, and written and directed by A. Kodandarami Reddy. The film stars Nandamuri Balakrishna and Vijayashanti, with music composed by Bappi Lahiri and Raj–Koti. Nippu Ravva and Bangaru Bullodu, also starring Balakrishna, were released on the same day and both ran for over 100 days.

It was dubbed into Tamil and Hindi as Suriya and Mawaali Raaj, respectively.

Plot
The film begins with a doughty Suryam produced before the judiciary as a murder convict and sentenced to 7 years. Right away, he absconds from prison and abducts a sports star Vijaya, the sibling of local SP Indrani. Currently, he hides her in a remote area of forest where its tribes regard him. Vijaya makes various attempts to escape but fortuitously, is rescued by Suryam. Then, Vijaya understands his virtue, inquires him and he spins rearward.  

Suryam is a trade union leader at Balagam coal mines owned by a spiteful Balagam Dhanraj who suppresses the workers under his toe. Anyhow, Suryam always encounters his malpractices. The chief engineer & his family maintain a cordial relationship with him. Once, the engineer detects that Godavari water is going to drown the mines and notifies Dhanraj that he keeps a deaf ear for his greed. Wherefore, he walks to shield the workers but it's too late. The water floods the mines, endangering the lives of hundreds. Suryam succeeds in bailing out the miners he can when he files a case against Dhanraj and claims for indemnity. 

During the tribunal, Dhanraj intrigues by assassinating the engineer via his sidekick Dasu. Plus, he makes him accountable for the catastrophe when the lawsuit is called off. Be aware that, Suryam chases Dasu when he is screened by a wicked cop SI Prabhakar with fake alibis. Upon this, Suryam raises an interstellar movement that shakes the country. Additionally, his hunger strike intensifies it. To distract his initiation Dhanraj's son Kumar drags away Suryam's sister Bharati and molests her. Consequently, Dhanraj orders to slay her but timely Suryam defends when Dasu dies in his hand and is imprisoned. 

Presently, Suryam aims to knit Kumar with Bharati. Hearing it, Vijaya endears him and is determined to aid in his mission. As of today, Suryam's stand-off Indrani for Kumar instead of Vijaya, while swapping Kumar skips in the verge. Meanwhile, Bharati conceives, and Indrani knew the injustice that happened to her. So, she proceeds legally where she fails withal Bharati is besmirched. At this juncture, Indrani & Vijaya supports Suryam to seize Kumar and he moves to the forest. On the way, he attempts to kill Suryam contrariwise guarded by him when he reforms. Now, Dhanraj onslaughts on the forest, and heavy action occurs. At last, Suryam ceases the baddies and the court declares him guilty with a death sentence. Finally, the movie ends with Suryam stepping for his penalty.

Cast

 Nandamuri Balakrishna as Suryam
 Vijayashanti as Vijaya
 Shobana as Special Appearance
 Amrish Puri as Balagam Dhanraj
 Rao Gopal Rao as Labour Minister
 Allu Ramalingaiah as Lawyer Buildup Masthan Rao
 Kanada Prabhakar as S.I. Prabhakar
 Mohan Raj as Gundappa
 Nizhalgal Ravi as Engineer
 Babu Antony as Dasu
 Jaya Prakash Reddy as Labour Officer
 Raja Ravindra as Kumar
 Prasanna Kumar as Sudhakar
 Mallikarjuna Rao as Constable
 Babu Mohan as Koyadora
 Sakshi Ranga Rao as Coolie 
 Chitti Babu as Constable 
 Sujatha as Mahalakshmi
 Lakshmi as S.P.
 Geetha as Lawyer Gayatri
 Kasturi as Bharathi
 Shilpa as Labour Minister's daughter
 Y. Vijaya as Labour Minister's wife
 Baby Shamili as Engineer's daughter

Soundtrack

The songs featured in the film was composed by Bappi Lahiri with Raj–Koti composing only one song "Randi Kadilirandi". It was released by the Lahari Music Company.

 Hindi
" Gaal Gulaabi" - Suresh Wadkar, Kavita Krishnamurthy
"Mawali Raj Aa Gaya" - Suresh Wadkar
"Rang Rangeela Mausam Aaya" - Suresh Wadkar, Kavita Krishnamurthy

Other
 VCDs and DVDs on - VOLGA Videos, Hyderabad
 Dubbed in Hindi as Mawali Raj

References

1993 films
Films directed by A. Kodandarami Reddy
Films scored by Bappi Lahiri
Films scored by Raj–Koti
Films scored by A. R. Rahman
1990s Telugu-language films